Jozini is a settlement in Umkhanyakude District Municipality in the KwaZulu-Natal province of South Africa.

Jozini is a small town on the main route to Mozambique, and it is close to the Jozini or Pongolapoort Dam. Lake Jozini, as the dam is called, has become very popular as a Tiger fishing destination.

References

Populated places in the Jozini Local Municipality